Schmieder is a surname. Notable people with the surname include:

Eduard Schmieder (born 1948), German violinist and teacher
Günther Schmieder (born 1957), German nordic combined skier
Heinrich Schmieder (1970-2010), German actor
Helmut Schmieder, German conoeist
Oskar Schmieder (1891–1980), the namesake of Schmiederite
Robert Schmieder (born 1941), American scientist and explorer
Werner Schmieder (born 1926), German politician 
Wolfgang Schmieder (1901-1990), German musicologist

de:Schmieder